Giacomo Villani (1605 – 5 November 1690) was a Roman Catholic prelate who served as Bishop of Caiazzo (1679–1690).

Biography
Giacomo Villani was born in Fossoli di Ravenna, Italy in 1605. On 27 November 1679, he was appointed by Pope Innocent XI as Bishop of Caiazzo. On 30 November 1679, he was consecrated bishop by Cardinal Alessandro Crescenzi, Bishop of Recanati e Loreto, with Prospero Bottini, Titular Archbishop of Myra, and Pier Antonio Capobianco, Bishop Emeritus of Lacedonia serving as co-consecrators. He served as Bishop of Caiazzo until his death on 5 November 1690.

References

External links and additional sources
 (for Chronology of Bishops) 
 (for Chronology of Bishops)  

17th-century Italian Roman Catholic bishops
Bishops appointed by Pope Innocent XI
1605 births
1690 deaths